Anthonius is a Danish, Dutch, Finnish and Norwegian masculine given name that is used in Greenland, Finland, Norway, Republic of Karelia, Estonia, Namibia, South Africa, the Netherlands, Belgium and Denmark. Notable people with this name include the following:

 Anthonius Cornelis Boerma (1852 - 1908), Dutch architect
 Anthonius Wilhelmus Johannes Kolen, known as Antoon Kolen (1953 – 2004), Dutch mathematician
 Anthonius Jacobus Kuys, known as Anton Kuys (1903 – 1978), Dutch cyclist.
 Anthonius Josephus Maria Leeuwenberg, nicknamed "Toon" (1930 – 2010), Dutch botanist and taxonomist
 Anthonius Triest (1576 – 1657), Belgian Roman Catholic Bishop
 Anthonius Petrus van Os, known as Ton van Os (born 1941), Dutch artist

See also

Anthonis
Antonius

Notes

Danish masculine given names
Dutch masculine given names
Finnish masculine given names
Norwegian masculine given names